The Swedish Senior Curling Championships is an annual curling tournament held to determine the best senior-level men's and women's curling teams in Sweden. Senior level curlers must be over the age of 50 as of June 30 in the year prior to the tournament. It has been held annually since the 1962-1963 season for senior men ("oldboys") and the 1971-1972 season for senior women ("oldgirls"); the championship events are organized by the Swedish Curling Association. The championship teams play at the World Senior Curling Championships the following year.

Champions

Men (Oldboys)

Women (Oldgirls)

References

See also
Swedish Men's Curling Championship
Swedish Women's Curling Championship
Swedish Mixed Curling Championship
Swedish Mixed Doubles Curling Championship
Swedish Junior Curling Championships